Edmund Bernard Jankowski (28 August 1903 – 1 November 1939) was a Polish rower who competed in the 1928 Summer Olympics.

Jankowski was born in Wrocki, Golub-Dobrzyń County. In 1928 he won the bronze medal as member of the Polish boat in the coxed four event.

He fought in the September Campaign of World War II. Jankowski was executed in the Valley of Death in Bydgoszcz.

References

External links
 profile 

1903 births
1939 deaths
Polish male rowers
Olympic rowers of Poland
Rowers at the 1928 Summer Olympics
Olympic bronze medalists for Poland
Olympic medalists in rowing
People from Golub-Dobrzyń County
Sportspeople from Kuyavian-Pomeranian Voivodeship
Polish military personnel killed in World War II
Polish people executed by Nazi Germany
Medalists at the 1928 Summer Olympics
European Rowing Championships medalists